V. Kasturi Rangan is an American economist currently the Malcolm P. McNair Professor of Marketing at Harvard Business School.

References

Year of birth missing (living people)
Living people
Harvard Business School faculty
American economists
Northwestern University alumni